Heinrich Preiswerk (born 19 May 1876) was a Swiss footballer who played for FC Basel in the 1890s.

Football career
FC Basel was founded on 15 November 1893 and Preiswerk joined the club about a year later, during their 1894–95 season. He played his first game for the club in the home game in the Stadion Schützenmatte on 5 May 1895 as Basel won 2–0 against Abstinenten FC Patria Basel.

He stayed with the club for two seasons and during this time Preiswerk played three games for Basel without scoring a goal.

Notes

Footnotes

References

Sources
 Rotblau: Jahrbuch Saison 2017/2018. Publisher: FC Basel Marketing AG. 
 Die ersten 125 Jahre. Publisher: Josef Zindel im Friedrich Reinhardt Verlag, Basel. 
 Verein "Basler Fussballarchiv" Homepage

FC Basel players
Swiss men's footballers
1876 births
Date of death missing
Association footballers not categorized by position